The Dunn-St.Croix Conference, or DSC, is a high school athletic conference in Western Wisconsin. It participates in the WIAA.

Current Schools
Current schools in the Dunn-St. Croix Conference are:
Boyceville High School
Colfax High School
Durand Jr./Sr. High School
Elk Mound High School
Elmwood High School
Glenwood City High School
Mondovi High School
Plum City High School
Spring Valley High School

See also
List of high school athletic conferences in Wisconsin

References

External links
Dunn-St.Croix Conference Website

Wisconsin high school sports conferences
High school sports conferences and leagues in the United States